Erotylinae is a subfamily of pleasing fungus beetles in the family Erotylidae.

Selected genera
 Acropteroxys Gorham, 1887
 Antillengis
 Aegithus
 Altisessor
 Aulacochilus
 Bacis
 Brachysphaenus
 Coccimorphus
 Combocerus
 Cryptodacne
 Cubyrus
 Cyclomorphus
 Cypherotylus Crotch, 1873
 Cyrtomorphus
 Cytorea
 Dacne Latreille, 1796
 Dasydactylus Gorham, 1887
 Dichomorpha
 Epytus
 Erotylus
 Euphanistes
 Eurycardius
 Haematochiton Gorham, 1888
 Hirsutotriplax Skelley, 1993
 Homeotelus
 Hoplepiscapha
 Ischyrus Lacordaire, 1842
 Kuschelengis
 Languria Latreille, 1802
 Langurites Motschulsky, 1860
 Lybanodes
 Megalodacne Crotch, 1873
 Micrencaustes
 Micrerotylus
 Microsternus Lewis, 1887
 Mycotretus Lacordaire, 1842
 Neopriotelus Alvarenga, 1965
 Neosternus
 Neoxestus
 Notaepytus
 Perithonius
 Phricobacis
 Plastococcus
 Prepopharus
 Pselaphacus
 Pseudischyrus Casey, 1916
 Rhynchothonius
 Scaphengis
 Scaphidomorphus
 Scelidopetalon
 Sphenoxus
 Tapinotarsus
 Thonius
 Triplax Herbst, 1793
 Tritoma Fabricius, 1775
 Xalpirta
 Zonarius

References

Further reading

 
 
 

Erotylidae